Album for the Young, Op. 68, was composed by Robert Schumann in 1848 for his three daughters. The album consists of a collection of 43 short works. The second part, starting at Nr. 19 (""), is marked  (For adults; For more grown-up ones) and contains more demanding pieces.

List of pieces

First part 

 Melodie (Melody), C major
 Soldatenmarsch (Soldiers' march), G major
 Trällerliedchen (Lilting song or Humming song), C major
 Ein Choral (Chorale), G major. Harmonisation of "Selig sind, die aus Erbamen" or "Freu dich sehr, o meine Seele" found in number 7 of BWV 39
 Stückchen (A little piece), C major
 Armes Waisenkind (The poor orphan), A minor
 Jägerliedchen (Hunting song), F major
 Wilder Reiter (The wild rider), A minor (This piece is more commonly known in English as "The Wild Horseman")
 Volksliedchen (Folk song), D minor
 Fröhlicher Landmann, von der Arbeit zurückkehrend ('The merry peasant', returning from work or 'The Happy Farmer'), F major (the 1907 song "Red Wing" is based on this melody; the tune was also used extensively in the underscore of The Wizard of Oz. This song is also played during the opening of the 3-D animation film Shrek)
 Sizilianisch (Sicilienne), A minor
 Knecht Ruprecht (Santa Claus), A minor
 Mai, lieber Mai (May, dear May), E major
 Kleine Studie (Little etude), G major
 Frühlingsgesang (Spring song), E major
 Erster Verlust (First loss), E minor
 Kleiner Morgenwanderer (Little morning wanderer), A major
 Schnitterliedchen (The reaper's song), C major

Second part 

Kleine Romanze (Little romance), A minor
 Ländliches Lied (Land song), A major
 * * * (untitled), C major (based on "Prison-Terzetto" ("Euch werde Lohn in bessern Welten") from Beethoven's Fidelio)
 Rundgesang (Chant), A major
 Reiterstück (The horseman), D minor
 Ernteliedchen (Harvest song), A major
 Nachklänge aus dem Theater (Echoes from the theatre), A minor
 * * * (untitled), F major
 Kanonisches Liedchen (Song in Canon form), A minor
 Erinnerung (4 November 1847) (Remembrance), A major (dedicated to Felix Mendelssohn)
 Fremder Mann (Foreign man), D minor
 * * * (untitled), F major
 Kriegslied (Song of war), D major
 Scheherazade, A minor
 Weinlesezeit – fröhliche Zeit! (Harvest time – happy time!), E major
 Thema (Theme), C major
Mignon, E-flat major
 Lied italienischer Marinari (Italian mariners' song), G minor
 Matrosenlied (Sailors' Song), G minor
 Winterzeit I (Wintertime I), C minor (sometimes considered one piece with Wintertime II)
 Winterzeit II (Wintertime II), C minor/C major
 Kleine Fuge (Little fugue), A major
 Nordisches Lied (Nordic Song – Salute to G.), F major (dedicated to Niels Gade; it is based on the cryptogram G-A-D-E)
 Figurierter Choral (Figurative chorale), F major
 Sylvesterlied (New Year's Eve song), A major

Appendix (selection) 
More pieces have been identified from various manuscripts; these are not formally numbered and are denoted as pieces from the appendix.

Soldatenmarsch (Soldiers' March, Clara Schumann version)
Wilder Reiter (The Wild Horseman, alternate version)
Für ganz Kleinem (For the very young)
Puppenschlafliedchen (Dolls' lullaby)
Canone "Aus ist der Schmaus, die Gäste gehn nach Haus" (Canon "The feast is over, the guests go home")
Auf der Gondel (On the gondola)
Linke Hand, soll sich auch zeigen (Left hand, should also show itself)
Gukkuk im Versteck (Cuckoo in hiding)
Ein Ländler von Franz Schubert (A Ländler by Franz Schubert)
Ein Thema von Georg Friedrich Händel (A theme by George Frideric Handel)
Haschemann
Fest in Tact, im Tone rein, Kanon für Singstimmen (Firmly on the beat, in pure intonation, canon for voices)
Ein Stückchen von Johann Sebastian Bach (A piece by Johann Sebastian Bach)
Ein Trinklied von C. M. von Weber (A drinking song by Carl Maria von Weber)
Lagune in Venedig (Lagoon in Venice)
Thema – Beethoven Op. 109 (Theme from Beethoven's op. 109)
Bärentanz (Bear dance)
Eine berühmte Melodie von L. van Beethoven (A famous tune by Ludwig van Beethoven)
Kleiner Walzer (Little waltz)
Ein Stückchen von Mozart (A piece by Mozart)
Rebus
Ein Stückchen von Gluck (A piece by Gluck)
Ein Stückchen von Beethoven (A piece by Beethoven)
Fragment, Es Dur (Fragment E-flat major)
Präludium (Prelude)
Walzer (Waltz)
 * * * (untitled) C Dur (C major)
 * * * (untitled) G Dur (G major)
 * * * (untitled) A Dur (A major)

References

External links 
  (Breitkopf & Härtel)
 Score at kreusch-sheet-music.net
 Album (selection). MP3s (No. 1, 2, 3, 5, 8, 9, 10, 16, 19), pianosociety.com
, Piano audio provided by Halidon Music
 with Chris Breemer

Piano music by Robert Schumann
Compositions for solo piano
1848 compositions